State Route 117 (SR 117) is a very short state highway in extreme eastern McNairy County, Tennessee.  This highway passes through one town (Adamsville) and acts as a shortcut from Adamsville to the nearby Shiloh National Military Park.

Route description

SR 117 begins near Shiloh National Military Park at an intersection with SR 142 between Stantonville and Hurley, in a community known as West Shiloh. The highway heads north as a 2-lane highway through farmland to have an intersection with Gilchrist Road, which serves as a connector to SR 224. SR 117 then enters Adamsville and has an intersection with Old Shiloh Road before entering downtown, where it comes to an end at an intersection with US 64/SR 15/SR 22.

The entire route is in McNairy County.

Major intersections

References
Tennessee Department of Transportation
McNairy County Highway Map

117
Transportation in McNairy County, Tennessee